Harden Shire was a local government area in the South West Slopes region of New South Wales, Australia. The Shire included the twin towns of Harden and Murrumburrah and the small towns of Galong, Jugiong, Wombat and Kingsvale.

The Shire was established in 1975 from the merger of the Municipality of Murrumburrah with Demondrille Shire. In 2016, Harden Shire was amalgamated with Boorowa Shire and Young Shire to create Hilltops Council.

The last mayor of Harden Shire was Cr. John Horton, an unaligned politician.

Council

Composition and election method
Harden Shire Council was composed of seven councillors elected proportionally as one entire ward. All councillors were elected for a fixed four-year term of office. The mayor was elected by the councillors at the first meeting of the council. The last democratic election was held on 8 September 2012, and the makeup of the council was as follows:

The final Council, elected in 2012 and dissolved in 2016, in order of election, was:

Amalgamation 
A 2015 review of local government boundaries recommended that Harden Shire merge with adjoining councils. The NSW Government considered two proposals. The alternative, proposed by Harden Shire on 28 February 2016, was for an amalgamation of the Cootamundra, Gundagai and Harden shires. Following an independent review, on 12 May 2016, the Minister for Local Government announced the dissolution of the Boorowa, Harden and Young shires and merged the areas to form the Hilltops Council with immediate effect.

Gallery

References

 
Former local government areas of New South Wales
1975 establishments in Australia
2016 disestablishments in Australia